Northern Star Resources is an Australian gold mining company with operations in Western Australia, Northern Territory and Alaska.

History
Northern Star Resources (NSR) was founded in December 2003 to search for and develop ore deposits in the East Kimberley region of Western Australia. It was listed on the Australian Securities Exchange in December 2003. In July 2010, it became a gold miner with the purchase of Paulsens Gold Mine. 

In October 2020, a merger between NSR and Saracen Metal Holdings, its joint venture partner in the Super Pit gold mine, was proposed. The merger was completed in February 2021 when Saracen was de-listed from the Australian Securities Exchange.

Operations

Current
Carosue Dam Gold Mine (4 underground mines: Karari, Whirling Dervish, Porphyry 45 km north and Deep South mine 70 km to the North)
Thunderbox Gold Mine (1 underground mine: Thunderground & 2 Open Pit Mines)
Jubilee Gold Mine
Jundee Gold Mine
Kanowna Belle Gold Mine
Paulsens Gold Mine (in care and maintenance)
Pogo mine
South Kalgoorlie Gold Mine
Super Pit gold mine

Former
Plutonic Gold Mine
Kundanda Gold Mine and East Kundana Joint Venture (51 percent Northern Star Resources), sold to Evolution Mining in July 2021

References

External links 
 MINEDEX website: Northern Star Resources Ltd Database of the Department of Mines, Industry Regulation and Safety

Companies based in Perth, Western Australia
Companies listed on the Australian Securities Exchange
Gold mining companies of Australia
Non-renewable resource companies established in 2003
2003 establishments in Australia